Djamil Soeherman (born April 24, 1924 in Sidoarjo, East Java, Indonesia), is an Indonesian journalist and poet. His name is also written as Djamil Soeherman, Jamil Suherman, or DS (de-es). Djamil's poetry focuses on social and religious themes and was mostly influenced by his traditional Islamic boarding school (Pesantren) background. In the later part of his life, he was a reporter and editor of the corporate magazine Gematel. He was known as an Indonesian poet and Indonesian writer.

Bibliography
His works consist of poems, novels and short stories: 
 Muara (Estuary) (with Kaswanda Saleh, (1958)
 Manifestasi (Manifestation) (1963)
 Perjalanan ke Akhirat (A Journey to Hereafter) (1963; a runner up for Indonesian literature magazine Sastra 1962)
 Umi Kulsum (1983)
 Nafiri (Trumpet) (1983)
 Pejuang-pejuang Kali Pepe (The Fighters of River Pepe) (1984)
 Sarip Tambakoso (1985)
 Sakerah (1985).

References

1924 births
1985 deaths
Javanese people
Indonesian male poets
Indonesian journalists
20th-century Indonesian poets
20th-century male writers
20th-century journalists